Fasman Yeshiva High School, known colloquially as Skokie Yeshiva, is an Orthodox Jewish all-boys high school in Skokie, Illinois. As of the 2020-2021 school year, the school has 120 students enrolled in grades 9-12. Fasman Yeshiva offers a dual curriculum of secular and Judaic studies.

Facilities 
Fasman Yeshiva High School is located on a  campus shared with Hebrew Theological College and Hillel Torah North Suburban Day School. The Administration Building (built 1954) includes a dining hall, auditorium, "the 2nd floor", library, dormitory and classrooms. The science laboratory, bookstore and game room are also in this building. The Beis Midrash building (built 1957) includes a large study hall as well as additional classrooms, an auditorium, and a fitness room. Sports facilities include a full-size outdoor basketball court, softball field, and a soccer field.

Academics

General Studies Department 
FYHS's general education program includes Advanced Placement college-level courses in biology, calculus,  AP US Government and Politics, U.S. history, Physics, and English. However, certain Advanced Placement offerings vary from year to year, As of the 2020-2021 school year, there are eleven advanced placement classes that are offered. Students are required to take a minimum of two years of modern, conversational Hebrew.

Torah Studies Department 
Fasman Yeshiva High School's Torah studies curriculum includes a preparatory shiur, which is designed to assist students with limited exposure to Talmud to develop their basic skills, in addition to three levels of Jewish studies( freshmen and junior classes only have two levels) classes per grade. Each Jewish studies teacher teaches his students Talmud, Jewish Law and Hebrew Bible. Additionally, many students are enrolled in a variety of optional Jewish studies classes after school hours.

Sports 
Fasman Yeshiva High School competes in both Basketball and Baseball interscholastically. Until the 2010-11 school year, the school had been a member of the Metro Prep Conference, but is now an independent team, which now competes in the state tournament sponsored by the Illinois High School Association.

There are multiple intramural leagues including basketball, baseball, football, and chess.

Notable alumni 
 David Draiman, songwriter and vocalist for band Disturbed as well as Device
 Rabbi David Hirsch, Rosh Yeshiva of Rabbi Isaac Elchanan Theological Seminary, an affiliate of Yeshiva University
 Rabbi Dovid Kaplan, author and senior lecturer at Ohr Somayach, Jerusalem
 Rabbi Berel Wein, Jewish historian and scholar
 David Steinberg, comedian, actor, director, writer, and producer
Rabbi Rapha Margolies, rebbe at Yeshivas Sha'alvim

See also 
 History of the Jews in Chicago

References

External links 
 

Educational institutions established in 1967
High schools in Skokie, Illinois
Jewish day schools in Chicago
Mesivtas
Modern Orthodox Jewish day schools in the United States
Orthodox Judaism in Illinois
Orthodox yeshivas in the United States
Private high schools in Cook County, Illinois